Nesselpfuhl is a lake in Uckermark, Brandenburg, Germany. Its surface area is 0.2140 km². It is located in the town of Lychen.

See also
Oberpfuhl
Wurlsee
Zenssee

Lakes of Brandenburg
Uckermark (district)
LNesselpfuhl